Leptolalax dringi (Dring's Asian toad) is a frog species in the family Megophryidae. It is endemic to Borneo and found in Kalimantan (Indonesia) and in Sarawak and Sabah (Malaysia). Its type locality is Mount Mulu in Gunung Mulu National Park. Its natural habitats are tropical moist lowland forests, moist montane forests, and rivers. It is becoming rare due to habitat loss.

References

dringi
Amphibians of Indonesia
Amphibians of Malaysia
Endemic fauna of Borneo
Amphibians described in 1987
Taxonomy articles created by Polbot
Taxobox binomials not recognized by IUCN
Amphibians of Borneo